Mike Turk is an American football coach and former player. He is the head football coach at Huntingdon College in Montgomery, Alabama, a position he has held since 2004. From 2003 to 2019, he was also the athletic director at Huntingdon. As a college football player, he was a quarterback for two NCAA Division II Football Championship-winning teams at Troy State University—now known as Troy University—in Troy, Alabama, in 1984 and 1987.

Head coaching record

References

External links
 Huntingdon profile

Year of birth missing (living people)
Living people
American football quarterbacks
Huntingdon Hawks athletic directors
Huntingdon Hawks football coaches
Troy Trojans football coaches
Troy Trojans football players